New Year's Eve Punch is a 1960 East German musical film directed by Günter Reisch and starring Erich Franz, Friedel Nowack and Erika Dunkelmann. It was made by the state-owned DEFA company. It is a sequel to the 1959 film The Punch Bowl.

Cast
 Erich Franz as Wilhelm Lehmann
 Friedel Nowack as Auguste Lehmann
 Erika Dunkelmann as Marion Lehmann
 Christel Bodenstein as Suse Lehmann
 Heinz Draehn as Franz Lehmann
 Achim Schmidtchen as Michel Lehmann
 Ernst-Georg Schwill as Knispel
 Karin Schröder as Ruth
 Wolfgang Roeder as Wolfgang
 Eberhard Keyn as Eberhard
 Erich Weber as Erich
 Johannes Frenzel as Hannes
 Albert Zahn as Otto
 Otto Busse as Karl
 Herbert Sturm as Herbert
 Edward Selz as Siggi
 Hubert Hoelzke as Egon Scheibe
 Gustav Müller as Erwin Lüttger
 Günter Rüger as Willibald Schmal
 Kurt Rackelmann as Briefträger Pätsch
 Rudolf Christoph as Werkleiter
 Heinz Quermann as Reporter
 Heinz Scholz as Objektleiter
 Gerd E. Schäfer as Lämmermeier
 Maria Alexander as Sängerin
 Maika Joseph as Garderobenfrau
 Nico Turoff as Kassierer an der Box-Kasse
 Joachim Zschocke as Verkehrspolizist
 Monika Bergen as Chemiemädchen

References

Bibliography 
 Lutz Peter Koepnick. The Cosmopolitan Screen: German Cinema and the Global Imaginary, 1945 to the Present. University of Michigan Press, 2007.

External links 
 

1960 films
German sequel films
East German films
German musical films
1960 musical films
1960s German-language films
Films directed by Günter Reisch
1960s German films